Oak Forest is a rural unincorporated community in southeastern Allen County, Kentucky, United States.

References

Unincorporated communities in Allen County, Kentucky
Unincorporated communities in Kentucky